Activated charcoal, also known as activated carbon, is a medication used to treat poisonings that occurred by mouth. To be effective it must be used within a short time of the poisoning occurring, typically an hour. It does not work for poisonings by cyanide, corrosive agents, iron, lithium, alcohols, or malathion. It may be taken by mouth or given by a nasogastric tube. Other uses include inside hemoperfusion machines.

Common side effects include vomiting, black stools, diarrhea, and constipation. A more serious side effect, pneumonitis, may result if aspirated into the lungs. Gastrointestinal obstruction and ileus are less common but serious adverse effects. Use in pregnancy and breastfeeding is generally safe. Activated charcoal works by adsorbing the toxin.

While charcoal has been used since ancient times for poisonings, activated charcoal has been used since the 1900s. It is on the World Health Organization's List of Essential Medicines.

Medical uses

Poison ingestion
Activated charcoal is used to treat many types of oral poisonings such as phenobarbital and carbamazepine. It is not effective for a number of poisonings including: strong acids or bases, iron, lithium, arsenic, methanol, ethanol or ethylene glycol.

Although activated charcoal is the most commonly used agent for GI decontamination in poisoned patients,  medical professionals use discretion when determining whether or not its use is indicated.  In a study of acute poisonings from agricultural pesticides and yellow oleander seeds, the administration of activated carbon did not affect survival rates.

Gastrointestinal tract-related issues
Charcoal biscuits were sold in England starting in the early 19th century, originally as remedy to flatulence and stomach trouble.

Tablets or capsules of activated carbon are used in many countries as an over-the-counter drug to treat diarrhea, indigestion, and flatulence. There is some evidence of its effectiveness to prevent diarrhea in cancer patients who have received irinotecan. It can interfere with the absorption of some medications, and lead to unreliable readings in medical tests such as the guaiac card test. Activated carbon is also used for bowel preparation by reducing intestinal gas content before abdominal radiography to visualize bile and pancreatic and renal stones. A type of charcoal biscuit has also been marketed as a pet care product.

Other
Claims that activated charcoal will do things such as whiten teeth, cure alcohol-induced hangovers, and prevent bloating, are not supported by evidence. Activated charcoal cleanses also lack evidence and are considered pseudoscience.

Side effects
Incorrect application (e.g. into the lungs) results in pulmonary aspiration which can sometimes be fatal if immediate medical treatment is not initiated. The use of activated carbon is contraindicated when the ingested substance is an acid, an alkali, or a petroleum product.

Mechanism of action
In cases of suspected poisoning, medical personnel administer activated carbon on the scene or at a hospital's emergency department. In rare situations, it may also be used in a hemoperfusion system to remove toxins from the blood stream of poisoned patients. Activated carbon has become the treatment of choice for many poisonings, and other decontamination methods such as ipecac-induced emesis or stomach pumping are now used rarely.
 Binding of the poison to prevent stomach and intestinal absorption.  Reversible binding using a cathartic, such as sorbitol, may be added.
 It interrupts the enterohepatic and enteroenteric circulation of some drugs/toxins and their metabolites.

References

External links
 

Carbon
Charcoal
Chemical substances for emergency medicine
Emergency medical procedures
Toxicology
World Health Organization essential medicines
Wikipedia medicine articles ready to translate